The method of levels (MOL) is a cognitive approach to psychotherapy (or an approach to cognitive behavioral therapy) based on perceptual control theory (PCT).  Using MOL, the therapist aims to help the patient shift his or her awareness to higher levels of perception in order to resolve conflicts and allow reorganization to take place.

Background
Psychotherapy has generally focused on pathology, although there have been exceptions such as Carl Rogers' emphasis on the actualizing tendency. PCT contributes a useful perspective on psychological disorders by providing a model of satisfactory psychological functioning as successful control. Dysfunction then is understood as disruption of successful control, and distress as the experience that results from a person's inability to control important experiences. No attempt is made to treat the symptoms of distress as though they were in themselves the problem. The PCT perspective is that restoring the ability to control eliminates the source of distress. Internal conflict has the effect of denying control to both systems that are in conflict with each other. Conflict is usually transitory. When conflict becomes chronic, then symptoms of psychological disorder may appear.

Method
The core process is to redirect attention to the higher level control systems by recognizing "background thoughts", bringing them into the foreground, and then being alert for more background thoughts while the new foreground thoughts are explored. When the level-climbing process reaches an end state without encountering any conflicts, the need for therapy may have ended. When, however, this "up-a-level" process bogs down, a conflict has probably surfaced, and the exploration can be turned to finding the systems responsible for generating the conflict—and away from a preoccupation with the symptoms and efforts immediately associated with the conflict.

Results of evaluation studies
A randomised controlled trial in subjects with first-episode psychosis demonstrated that the retention in the trial at final follow-up was 97%, suggesting a successful feasibility outcome. The feedback provided by participants delivered initial evidence of the intervention for this population. The approach may also be effective in the treatment of sleep disorders and suicidality.

See also
 Coherence therapy
 Common factors theory
 Focusing (psychotherapy)
 Metacognition

References

Further reading
 

 
 

Cognitive behavioral therapy